Loewer is a surname. Notable people with the surname include:

Barry Loewer (born 1945), American professor of philosophy
Carlton Loewer (born 1973), American baseball player
Deborah Loewer (born 1954), American military officer

See also
Loewenberg (disambiguation)
Lower (surname)